Lahiru Udara (born 27 November 1993) is a Sri Lankan cricketer. He made his first-class debut for Nondescripts Cricket Club in the 2013–14 Premier Trophy on 17 January 2014. In March 2018, he was named in Colombo's squad for the 2017–18 Super Four Provincial Tournament. He was the leading run-scorer in the 2019–20 Premier League Tournament, with 1,039 runs in nine matches. In October 2020, he was drafted by the Colombo Kings for the inaugural edition of the Lanka Premier League.

In July 2021, he was named in Sri Lanka's squad for their series against India. The following month, he was named in the SLC Greens team for the 2021 SLC Invitational T20 League tournament. In November 2021, he was selected to play for the Dambulla Giants following the players' draft for the 2021 Lanka Premier League.

In June 2022, he was named in the Sri Lanka A squad for their matches against Australia A during Australia's tour of Sri Lanka.

References

External links
 

1993 births
Living people
Sri Lankan cricketers
Colombo Cricket Club cricketers
Matara District cricketers
Nondescripts Cricket Club cricketers
Dambulla Aura cricketers
Cricketers from Colombo